Barrio Logan station is a station on the Blue Line of the San Diego Trolley located in the Logan Heights neighborhood of San Diego. The station's name is the Spanish translation of "Logan neighborhood" and the station primarily serves the corresponding Hispanic neighborhood. The stop is located near Chicano Park, famous for its artwork and legacy of protests for minority rights.

History

This station was renovated, starting September 28, 2013 as part of the Trolley Renewal Project; it reopened with a renovated station platform in early August 2014.

Station layout
There are two tracks, each with a side platform.

See also
 List of San Diego Trolley stations

References

Blue Line (San Diego Trolley)
Railway stations in the United States opened in 1981
San Diego Trolley stations in San Diego
1981 establishments in California